Events from the year 1886 in Canada.

Incumbents

Crown 
 Monarch – Victoria

Federal government 
 Governor General – Henry Petty-Fitzmaurice 
 Prime Minister – John A. Macdonald
 Chief Justice – William Johnstone Ritchie (New Brunswick)
 Parliament – 5th

Provincial governments

Lieutenant governors 
Lieutenant Governor of British Columbia – Clement Francis Cornwall 
Lieutenant Governor of Manitoba – James Cox Aikins 
Lieutenant Governor of New Brunswick – Samuel Leonard Tilley  
Lieutenant Governor of Nova Scotia – Matthew Henry Richey    
Lieutenant Governor of Ontario – John Beverley Robinson   
Lieutenant Governor of Prince Edward Island – Andrew Archibald Macdonald
Lieutenant Governor of Quebec – Louis-Rodrigue Masson

Premiers    
Premier of British Columbia – William Smithe 
Premier of Manitoba – John Norquay 
Premier of New Brunswick – Andrew George Blair  
Premier of Nova Scotia – William Stevens Fielding  
Premier of Ontario – Oliver Mowat    
Premier of Prince Edward Island – William Wilfred Sullivan 
Premier of Quebec – John Jones Ross

Territorial governments

Lieutenant governors 
 Lieutenant Governor of Keewatin – James Cox Aikins
 Lieutenant Governor of the North-West Territories – Edgar Dewdney

Events
March 25 – Workman's Compensation Act passed in Ontario
April 6 – Vancouver incorporated as a city
April 26 – 1886 New Brunswick general election
June 7 – Elzéar-Alexandre Taschereau becomes the first Canadian cardinal
June 8 to 15 – 1886 Nova Scotia general election: William Stevens Fielding's Liberals win a third consecutive majority.
June 13 – Great Vancouver Fire 
June 30 – 1886 Prince Edward Island general election: William Wilfred Sullivan Conservatives win a fifth consecutive majority.
July 20 – 1886 British Columbia general election
October 14 – 1886 Quebec general election: Honoré Mercier's Liberals win a majority
December 9 – 1886 Manitoba general election
December 14 – Yoho National Park established
December 28 – 1886 Ontario general election: Sir Oliver Mowat's Liberals win a fifth consecutive majority.

Full date unknown
Mohawk men of the Caughnawaga Reserve in Quebec are trained to help build a bridge across the St. Lawrence River, beginning a tradition of high steel construction work among the Iroquois.
Construction begins on the Banff Springs Hotel

Births
January 15 – C. D. Howe, politician and Minister (d.1960)
January 21 – George Kingston, meteorologist (b.1816) 
May 13 – William John Patterson, politician and 6th Premier of Saskatchewan (d.1976)
August 4 – Pierre-François Casgrain, politician and Speaker of the House of Commons of Canada (d.1950)
August 30 – Ray Lawson, 17th Lieutenant Governor of Ontario (d.1980)
September 20 – John Murray Anderson, Canadian-born American actor, dancer, theatre director (d. 1954 in the United States)
October 16 – Joseph-Arthur Bradette, politician (d.1961)

Deaths

March 30 – Joseph-Alfred Mousseau, politician and 6th Premier of Quebec (b.1837)
March 31 – Amos Wright, farmer and politician (b.1809)
June 25 
 Auguste Achintre, journalist and essayist (b.1834)
 Jean-Louis Beaudry, entrepreneur, politician and 11th Mayor of Montreal (b.1809)
July 4 – Poundmaker, Cree chief (b. c1842)
November 23 – William Jack, astronomer (b.1817)

Historical documents
Edward Blake speaks on Louis Riel's execution and Northwest maladministration

Wilfrid Laurier's House of Commons speech condemns Louis Riel's execution

Crown issues amnesty for all those not convicted of crimes in 1885 conflict

Ojibwe, Cree and Inuit medical practice and materials (Note: "primitive" and other stereotypes)

Painting: Agent dispenses flour rations to Siksika people

Account of destruction of Vancouver by fire

"Decent Canadian" robs Qu'Appelle stage coach

New York City businessman wants Chief Poundmaker for Buffalo Bill's Wild West show

References
  

 
Years of the 19th century in Canada
Canada
1886 in North America